Church of God is a name used by numerous denominational bodies. The largest denomination with this name is the Church of God (Cleveland, Tennessee)

Adventist Churches of God 

 Church of God General Conference (Church of God of the Abrahamic Faith, CoGGC)
 Church of the Blessed Hope (Church of God of the Abrahamic Faith, CGAF)
 Church of God (Seventh-Day) (CoG7)

Anabaptist 
 Church of God in Christ, Mennonite
 Church of God (New Dunkers)

Armstrongism 

 Grace Communion International, formerly the Worldwide Church of God, which has repudiated virtually all Armstrongist beliefs starting in the late 1980s
 Church of God International (United States), based in Tyler, Texas
 Church of God Preparing for the Kingdom of God
 Church of the Great God, based in Charlotte, North Carolina
 Global Church of God, based in the UK, affiliated with the Church of the Eternal God (U.S.) and the Church of God, a Christian Fellowship, (Canada)
 Intercontinental Church of God, based in Tyler, Texas
 Living Church of God, based in Charlotte, North Carolina
 Philadelphia Church of God, based in Edmond, Oklahoma
 Restored Church of God, based in Wadsworth, Ohio
 United Church of God, based in Milford, Ohio
 Church of God, a Worldwide Association, separated from United Church of God in 2010. Based in McKinney, Texas

Baptist 

 Christian Baptist Church of God
 Churches of God General Conference (Winebrenner) (CGGC), of John Winebrenner

Brethren 
 The Churches of God in the Fellowship of the Son of God, the Lord Jesus Christ, also known as Needed Truth Brethren

Wesleyan holiness movement 

 Church of God (Anderson, Indiana)
 Church of God (Guthrie, Oklahoma)
 Church of God (Holiness)
 Church of God (Restoration)

Pentecostal movement 

 Church of God (Cleveland, Tennessee), the largest denomination with this name
 Church of God (Huntsville, Alabama)
 Church of God (Jerusalem Acres)
 Church of God for All Nations
 Church of God in Christ
 Church of God by Faith
 Church of God, House of Prayer
 Church of God Mountain Assembly
 Church of God of the Original Mountain Assembly
 Church of God of the Union Assembly
 Church of God of Prophecy
 Church of God with Signs Following (best known for their open practice of snake handling)
 The Church of God (Charleston, Tennessee)
 The Church of God, Alexander Jackson Sr. General Overseer
 The (Original) Church of God (Chattanooga, Tennessee)
 Original Church of God or Sanctified Church, (Nashville, Tennessee)
 Apostolic Overcoming Holy Church of God
 Fire Baptized Holiness Church of God of the Americas
 Indian Pentecostal Church of God, (Eluru and Kerala, India)
 New Testament Christian Churches of America, (New Testament Church of God)
 Pentecostal Church of God, (Bedford, Texas)
 The Pentecostal Church of God (Detroit)
 Redeemed Christian Church of God, (Nigeria)

Nontrinitarian sects 
 Members Church of God International, with its headquarters in Apalit, Pampanga, Philippines

South Korean churches 
 Church of God (South Korea)
 World Mission Society Church of God
 New Covenant Passover Church of God
 Church of God Jesus Witnesses

Other denominations 
 The Church of Jesus Christ of Latter-day Saints, in its origination period in the early 1830s named "Church of God" after "Church of Jesus Christ" and before today's name in 1834
 La Luz del Mundo, a church founded in Mexico in 1926. Officially named the "Church of the Living God, Pillar and Ground of the Truth, The Light of the World"